is a Japanese football player. He plays for Vegalta Sendai in loan of Cerezo Osaka.

Career
Motohiko Nakajima joined Cerezo Osaka in 2016. On, he debuted in J3 League (v Kagoshima United FC).

Club statistics
Updated to 14 September 2022.

International 

 Japan national under-16 football team
 Japan national under-17 football team
 Japan national under-18 football team

References

External links
Profile at Cerezo Osaka

1999 births
Living people
Association football people from Osaka Prefecture
Japanese footballers
J1 League players
J2 League players
J3 League players
Cerezo Osaka players
Cerezo Osaka U-23 players
Albirex Niigata players
Vegalta Sendai players
Association football forwards